Daniel 'Dani' López Albés (born 31 March 1992) is a Spanish professional footballer who plays as a midfielder.

Club career
Born in Barcelona, Catalonia, López made his senior debut with lowly CD Masnou in the 2010–11 season, in Tercera División. In July 2012, he joined Segunda División B club CF Fuenlabrada.

López moved abroad in the following summer, signing for Doxa Katokopias FC in Cyprus. On 3 February 2014 he returned to his homeland, agreeing to a six-month loan contract at UD Almería B in the third level.

Honours
Viitorul
Liga I: 2016–17
Cupa României: 2018–19

References

External links

1992 births
Living people
Footballers from Barcelona
Spanish footballers
Association football midfielders
Segunda División B players
Tercera División players
CD Masnou players
CF Fuenlabrada footballers
UD Almería B players
Cypriot First Division players
Doxa Katokopias FC players
Liga I players
FC Viitorul Constanța players
Spanish expatriate footballers
Expatriate footballers in Cyprus
Expatriate footballers in Romania
Spanish expatriate sportspeople in Cyprus
Spanish expatriate sportspeople in Romania